The City of Collingwood was a local government area about  east-northeast of Melbourne, the state capital of Victoria, Australia.

History

Collingwood was first incorporated as a district on 24 April 1855, having split from the City of Melbourne on the same day as the neighbouring City of Richmond. It was split into two boroughs — Collingwood and East Collingwood — in 1863, which became towns on 23 May 1873 and 21 April 1873 respectively. They recombined into the City of Collingwood on 14 January 1876.

On 22 June 1994, the City of Collingwood was abolished, and along with the Cities of Fitzroy and Richmond, and parts of Fairfield and Alphington from the City of Northcote, was merged into the newly created City of Yarra.

Council meetings were held at the Collingwood Town Hall, on Hoddle Street, Abbotsford.

Mayors

Wards

The City of Collingwood was divided into three wards on 31 May 1887, each electing three councillors:
 Abbotsford Ward
 Clifton Hill Ward
 Collingwood Ward

Suburbs
 Abbotsford
 Clifton Hill
 Collingwood*

* Council seat.

Population

* Estimate in the 1958 Victorian Year Book.

References

External links
 Victorian Places - Collingwood

Collingwood
City of Yarra
1994 disestablishments in Australia
1855 establishments in Australia